Jarred Barnes (born 9 February 1988) is an Irish cricketer. He made his first-class debut for Leinster Lightning in the 2018 Inter-Provincial Championship on 29 May 2018. He made his Twenty20 debut for Munster Reds in the 2018 Inter-Provincial Trophy on 6 July 2018.

References

External links
 

1988 births
Living people
Cricketers from Durban
Irish cricketers
Leinster Lightning cricketers
Munster Reds cricketers